The Functional Party of Struggle was a political party in Indonesia.  It contested the 2009 elections, but received only 0.3 percent of the vote, well below the threshold of 2.5% of the political votes, and was awarded no seats in the People's Representative Council. The party was established by Lt. Gen (ret) Muhammad Yasin and members of Susilo Bambang Yudhoyono's 2004 election campaign team. Most of its election candidates were retired military officers. On 31 August 2012, the party officially merged into the Democratic Party.

References

Pancasila political parties
Political parties in Indonesia